The Brabham BT17 was a one-off sports prototype race car, designed by British-Australian engineer Ron Tauranac, and developed and built by British manufacturer, constructor, and Formula One racing team, Brabham. It was built to Group 7 racing specifications, in 1966, and was the only Group 7 sports car built by Brabham. Only one single model was produced. It only contested three sports car races, scoring no wins, podiums, pole positions, or points finishes.

It was also notably the last sports car to bear the Brabham name for 52 years, until the Brabham BT62 was introduced, in 2018. It was initially powered by a  Repco V8 engine, however, due to reliability problems with the original engine, the engine was swapped with a smaller  Repco 620 V8 engine, producing , and drove the rear wheels via a Hewland 5-speed manual transmission.

References

Sports racing cars
Brabham racing cars
Sports prototypes